The Metro Manila Film Festival Award for Most Gender-Sensitive Film is an award presented annually by the Metropolitan Manila Development Authority (MMDA). It was first awarded at the 29th Metro Manila Film Festival ceremony, held in 2003; the film Homecoming won the award and it is given to the best representation of gender-sensitivity or modification of behavior by raising awareness of gender equality concerns in a motion picture. Currently, nominees and winners are determined by Executive Committees, headed by the Metropolitan Manila Development Authority Chairman and key members of the film industry. The award was not presented from 2014 to 2018 until it was accepted by Mindanao on the 45th Metro Manila Film Festival.

Winners and nominees

2000s

2010s

2020s

Notes

References

External links
IMDB: Metro Manila Film Festival
Official website of the Metro Manila Film Festival

Gender-Sensitive Film
Gender equality
Gender in film